Tawada (written: 多和田) is a Japanese surname. Notable people with the surname include:

, Japanese actor and model
, Japanese video game composer and sound effects designer
, Japanese writer

Japanese-language surnames